Nicete Xavier Miessa (née Bruno; 7 January 1933 – 20 December 2020), known professionally as Nicette Bruno, was a Brazilian actress.

Personal life
Bruno was born in Niterói. She was married to actor Paulo Goulart from 1958 until his death in 2014. She died on 20 December 2020 of complications from COVID-19 during the COVID-19 pandemic in Brazil, eighteen days short of her 88th birthday.

Filmography

Film

Television

References

External links

1933 births
2020 deaths
People from Niterói
Brazilian television actresses
Brazilian telenovela actresses
Deaths from the COVID-19 pandemic in Rio de Janeiro (state)
Brazilian spiritualists
20th-century Brazilian actresses
21st-century Brazilian actresses